Bogdan Grzejszczak (born 2 June 1950) is a Polish sprinter. He competed in the men's 200 metres at the 1976 Summer Olympics held in Montreal, Quebec, Canada and he finished in 6th place. He also competed in the men's 4 × 100 metres relay and the Polish team finished in 4th place.

References

1950 births
Living people
Athletes (track and field) at the 1976 Summer Olympics
Polish male sprinters
Olympic athletes of Poland
Place of birth missing (living people)